The Institute for Analytical Sociology is a research institute based in Sweden aiming at deepening the understanding of social, political, and cultural matters. It is linked to Linköping University and has its headquarters at Campus Norrköping.

External links
 The Institute for Analytical Sociology

Sociological organizations
2014 establishments in Sweden
Research institutes in Sweden